Herman Brenner White (born 28 September 1948) is an American physicist who works at Fermilab. He won the 2010 American Physical Society Edward A Bouchet Award.

Early life and education 
White was born in Tuskegee, Alabama. His mother, Susie Mae Fort White, worked at John Andrew Hospital and his father, Herman Brenner White Senior, served in the military. He studied at the Tuskegee Institute High School, where he became interested in nuclear engineering. He was raised in a segregated community. He saw his role in the civil rights movement as being an exceptional student who could prove that black people deserved equal access to education. He studied nuclear physics at Earlham College, before joining Michigan State University, earning a bachelor's degree in physics in 1970. White was awarded an Alfred P. Sloan Foundation Fellowship to study at CERN, and also worked as a research associate at Argonne National Laboratory. He completed his master's degree in 1974. He joined Fermilab in 1974, where he was the first African-American physicist to be appointed.

Research and career 
White held various roles at Fermilab since joining in 1974. Working with his supervisor, Ray Stefanski, he developed a simple formula to calculate neutrino flux. In 1976 he joined Yale University as a research fellow. He joined Florida State University for his doctoral studies, earning a PhD in 1991. He joined the Universidad Autónoma de San Luis Potosí to work on kaons. In 1994, White was appointed the Illinois Research Corridor Fellow and adjunct professor at North Central College. He also worked on the neutrino oscillation experiment (E701) and SciBooNE. He studies neutrino cross-sections and muon conversion. In 2006 his life story was recorded by the HistoryMakers of Chicago as part of the oral history archives.

White supports students from diverse backgrounds in their careers in physics. In 2010 White was awarded the American Physical Society Edward A. Bouchet Award for his work on the Tevatron experiment and outstanding public service. He serves on the advisory board for QuarkNet, National Society of Black Physicists and the Illinois Institute of Technology. He is a member of the Teachers Academy for Mathematics and Science in Chicago. He served on the advisory panel for the United States Department of Energy and National Science Foundation. He ran for congress in the 11th congressional district of Illinois in 2016. In 2017 he appeared in a series of online videos for Science the Day!. He took part in The Story Collider in Batavia, Illinois in 2018.

References 

Michigan State University alumni
Florida State University alumni
People from Tuskegee, Alabama
Earlham College alumni
Physics educators
Living people
1948 births
People associated with Fermilab
20th-century American physicists
21st-century American physicists
People associated with CERN
20th-century African-American scientists
21st-century African-American scientists